Schorndorf is a town in Baden-Württemberg, Germany, located approximately 26 km east of Stuttgart. Its train station is the terminus of the S2 line of the Stuttgart S-Bahn.

Demographics 
The numbers of inhabitants are estimates, census results (1871–1970 and 1987) or data from statistical office‎ Before 1871 the results are only from the core town.

Mayors
 1819–1821: Christian Rapp (politician) (1771–1853)
 1821–1828: Gottlieb Friedrich von Stum (1791–1849)
 1828–1845: Philipp Friedrich Palm (1759–1845)
 1845–1866:
 1866–1872: Johannes Frasch
 1879–1903: Jakob Friz
 1903–1905: Heinrich Beisswanger
 1905–1933: Jakob Raible (1870–1949)
 1933–1945: Richard Beeg (1888–1945)
 1945: Walter Arnold (entrepreneur) (1891–1973)
 1945–1948: Gottlob Kamm (SPD) (1897–1973)
 1948–1954: Emil Hayer (1887–1977)
 1954–1962: Franz Illenberger (1902–1974)
 1962–1982: Rudolf Bayler (1917–2007)
 1982–1990: Reinhard Hanke (SPD) (born 1940)
 1990–2006: Winfried Kübler (CDU) (born 1939)
 since 2006: Matthias Klopfer (SPD) (born 1968)

Places of interest
Ostlandkreuz

Twin towns – sister cities

Schorndorf is twinned with:

 Bury, United Kingdom (1994)
 Dueville, Italy (1998)
 Errenteria, Spain (2012)
 Kahla, Germany (1991)
 Radenthein, Austria (1966)
 Tulle, France (1969)
 Tuscaloosa, United States (1996)
 Svitlovodsk, Ukraine (2023)

Notable people
Josias Weitbrecht (1702–1747), the most important anatomist of his time
Ludovike Simanowiz (1759–1827), painter
Karl Friedrich Reinhard (1761–1837), French statesman and writer
Johann Philipp Palm (1766–1806), bookseller trader in Nuremberg
Gottlieb Daimler (1834–1900), engineer, designer and industrialist
Julius Schmid (1865–1955), inventor and entrepreneur
Reinhold Maier (1889–1971), politician (FDP)
Edmond Haan (1924–2018), French footballer
Gerhard Graf-Martinez (born 1952), flamenco guitarist, author and composer
Konstantinos Konstantinidis (born 1972), Greek footballer
Sven Ulreich (born 1988), footballer
Viola Brand (born 1994), vice world champion in artistic cycling
Davie Selke (born 1995), footballer

Gallery

References

Rems-Murr-Kreis
Württemberg